Isenburg-Isenburg was the name of a state of the Holy Roman Empire, based around Isenburg in modern Rhineland-Palatinate, Germany. It was created as a partition of the Niederlahngau in 1137. It partitioned into Lower Isenburg and Isenburg-Braunsberg in 1199. 

House of Isenburg
Counties of the Holy Roman Empire